Hajji Aziz-e Cheshmeh Sefid (also Romanized as Ḩājjī ʿAzīz-e Cheshmeh Sefīd; also known as Ḩājīazīz) is a village in Mahidasht Rural District, Mahidasht District, Kermanshah County, Kermanshah Province, Iran. At the 2006 census, its population was 225, in 52 families.

References 

Populated places in Kermanshah County